Glover is an unincorporated community in southern Iron County, Missouri, United States. It is located on Route 49, approximately eight miles south of Ironton.

A post office called Glover was established in 1888, and remained in operation until 1991.  The community has the name of John Milton Glover, a state legislator.

The lead smelter at Glover was operated by Doe Run Company and was a major local employer until operations were indefinitely suspended in 2003.

References

Unincorporated communities in Iron County, Missouri
Unincorporated communities in Missouri